The Bredene Koksijde Classic, previously Handzame Classic,  is a European single day cycle race held in the Belgian region of Flanders, starting in Bredene and finishing in Koksijde. Having been a part of the Driedaagse van West-Vlaanderen from 2002 to 2010, race organisers decided to run the race as a single-day race from 2011 and organized as a 1.1 event on the UCI Europe Tour, raised to 1.HC status from 2018. The finish race previously known as Handzame Classic, but was renamed following a decision from the organisers to move the finish from Handzame to Koksijde. The first edition under the new name was held in 2019.

Winners

References

External links
 

Cycle races in Belgium
UCI Europe Tour races
Recurring sporting events established in 2011
2011 establishments in Belgium
Handzame Classic